Editorialist is a luxury accessories e-commerce website. The website was founded on February 7, 2013 by the two leading accessories editors at Elle, Kate Davidson Hudson and Stefania Allen. It focuses on luxury accessories such as shoes, bags and jewelry. According to the Council of Fashion Designers of America, "It is the only online or brick-and-mortar destination focused exclusively on the luxury accessories market." The website provides an online marketplace, concierge service, news, interviews, videos and trend reports. In 2014, the website launched a biannual print edition of the same name. In 2017 Business of Fashion reported that  Scooter Braun's Ithaca Ventures invested in Editorialist.

Editorialist (magazine)
Editorialist is a semi-annual magazine that is published by the e-commerce website of the same name. It was launched on February 5, 2014 by website founders Kate Davidson Hudson and Stefania Allen who had previously been fashion accessories editors at Elle. The debut issue featured Nina Agdal on the cover, one week after she was featured on the 50th anniversary Sports Illustrated Swimsuit Issue cover. The magazine debuted during the same week that rival Net-a-Porter launched its bimonthly magazine.

Notes

External links
official website

2013 establishments in the United States
Online retailers of the United States
Fashion websites
Internet properties established in 2013